Christmas: The Gift is an album released in 1996 by country music artist Collin Raye. It was Raye's first Christmas album. It is composed largely of cover songs, except for "It Could Happen Again", which was newly written and recorded for this album.

Track listing 
 "The Christmas Song" (Mel Tormé, Robert Wells) – 4:18
 "I'll Be Home for Christmas" (Walter Kent, Kim Gannon, Buck Ram) – 4:24
 "It Could Happen Again" (Tamara Hyler, Will Robinson, Bruce Burch) – 4:10
 spoken intro by Johnny Cash
 "The First Noel" (William Sandys, Traditional) – 4:29
 "Away in a Manger" (Traditional) – 2:58
 "White Christmas" (Irving Berlin) – 4:29
 "Winter Wonderland" (Dick Smith, Felix Bernard) – 3:20
 guest vocals by The Beach Boys
 "Angels We Have Heard on High" (Traditional) – 2:51
 "The Little Drummer Boy" (Harry Simeone, Katherine Davis, Henry Onorati) – 3:19
 "Silent Night" (Franz Gruber, Joseph Mohr) – 3:21
 "The First Noel (Instrumental)" (William Sandys, traditional) – 4:30
 "O Holy Night" (Adolphe Adam, John Sullivan Dwight) – 5:03

Personnel

 David Angell – violin
 Monisa Angell – viola
 Sam Bacco – percussion
 Larry Cansler – orchestration
 Johnny Cash – spoken intro on "It Could Happen Again"
 Joe Chemay – bass, background vocals
 Pat Coil – keyboards
 Ernie Collins – trombone
 Joann Cruthirds – viola
 David Davidson – violin
 Cynthia Estill – bassoon
 Dennis Good – trombone
 Carl Gorodetzky – violin
 Barry Green – trombone
 Gerald Greer – violin
 Jim Grosjean – viola
 Phil Hansen – cello
 Mike Haynes – trumpet
 John Hobbs – keyboards
 Mary Hoepfinger – harp
 Jim Hoke – harmonica
 Dann Huff – acoustic guitar, electric guitar
 Ron Huff – string arrangements
 Al Jardine – background vocals on "Winter Wonderland"
 Bruce Johnston – background vocals on "Winter Wonderland"
 Jana King – background vocals
 Lee Larrison – violin
 Paul Leim – drums
 Lee Levine – clarinet
 Sam Levine – flute
 Mike Love – background vocals on "Winter Wonderland"
 Chris McDonald – trombone
 Anthony LaMarchina – cello
 Anthony Martin – background vocals
 Bob Mason – cello
 Margaret Mason – cello
 Farrell Morris – percussion
 Cate Myer – violin
 Craig Nelson – bass
 Carole Rabinowitz-Neuen – cello
 Leslie Norton – french horn
 Randall Olson – violin
 Mary Kathryn Van Osdale – violin
 Kathryn Plummer – viola
 Collin Raye – lead vocals, background vocals
 Ann Richards – flute
 John Wesley Ryles – background vocals
 Antoine Silverman – violin
 Pamela Sixfin – violin
 Calvin Smith – french horn
 Elizabeth Stewart – bass
 Bruce Sweetman – violin
 Julia Tanner – cello
 Bobby G. Taylor – oboe
 Christian Teal – violin
 Paul Tobias – violin
 Alan Umstead – violin
 Catherine Umstead – violin
 David Vanderkooi – cello
 Cindy Richardson-Walker – background vocals
 Billy Joe Walker Jr. – acoustic guitar
 Biff Watson – acoustic guitar
 Kristin Wilkinson – viola
 Brian Wilson – background vocals on "Winter Wonderland"
 Carl Wilson – background vocals on "Winter Wonderland"
 Jill Wilson – french horn
 Karen Winkelman – violin
 Joy Worland – french horn
 Brittany Wray – background vocals
 Clare Yang – viola

Chart performance

References 

1996 Christmas albums
Christmas albums by American artists
Country Christmas albums
Epic Records albums
Collin Raye albums